Fluoroacetaldehyde is a metabolic precursor of both fluoroacetate and 4-fluorothreonine in Streptomyces cattleya.

References

Organofluorides
Aldehydes
Fluorine-containing natural products